John van Lottum (born 10 April 1976) is a former tennis player from the Netherlands, who played professionally from 1994 to 2007. During his career, he won 5 Challenger titles in singles; notably defeated Lleyton Hewitt and Todd Martin; and reached the 4th round of Wimbledon in 1998.

The right-hander reached his career-high singles ranking on the ATP Tour in April 1999, when he became world No. 62. He has an older sister, Noëlle van Lottum, who played on the WTA Tour for France circuit from 1987 to 1999, with a career-high ranking of world No. 57 in singles.

After his tennis career he was considered as a coach for Michaëlla Krajicek, but instead joined TV channel Eurosport as a tennis commentator. In June 2008, he coached Elena Dementieva during the Ordina Open and Wimbledon.

Performance timeline

Singles

ATP Challenger and ITF Futures finals

Singles: 13 (5–8)

Doubles: 2 (1–1)

External links
 
 
 

1976 births
Living people
Dutch male tennis players
Sportspeople from Antwerp